Brij Basi Lal  is an Indian freedom fighter, politician and was Member of Parliament of India. He was a member of the 3rd Lok Sabha of India. Lal represented the Faizabad constituency of Uttar Pradesh and was a member of the Congress political party.

Early life and education
Brij Basi Lal was born in village Haripur, Jalalabad, Faizabad in the state of Uttar Pradesh. He attended University of Allahabad where he attained LL.B and B.Sc degrees. Lal worked as an advocate and was also a part of the Indian independence movement. He got married in 1949 and had three sons and five daughters from the marriage.

Political career

Pre independence
Brij Basi Lal was an Indian freedom fighter, participated in the Indian independence movement. He was a part of the Satyagraha and Quit India movements and was imprisoned in 1941 and 1942 for participating Satyagraha and Quit India movements respectively.

Post independence
Brij Basi Lal entered active politics in early 1930s. He joined Congress party. Prior to becoming a Member of Parliament, Lal was also a member of the Uttar Pradesh Legislative Assembly. In the 3rd Lok Sabha, Lal succeeded Raja Ram Misra who was also a Congress member.

Posts Held

See also

3rd Lok Sabha
Lok Sabha
Politics of India
Parliament of India
Government of India
Indian National Congress
Faizabad (Lok Sabha constituency)
List of Indian independence activists

References 

India MPs 1962–1967
1904 births
Indian National Congress politicians from Uttar Pradesh
Lok Sabha members from Uttar Pradesh
People from Faizabad
People from Faizabad district
Year of death missing
Indian independence activists from Uttar Pradesh